Crash Test World is a television program from ProjectExplorer starring former MythBusters host Kari Byron. It premiered on October 14, 2019 in Brooklyn, New York, and online via 5-minute excerpts. On February 20, 2020, ProjectExplorer announced that Escapade Media had sold the rights for the program in the United States and Canada to Discovery Channel. On December 22, 2020 Science Channel announced that Crash Test World would become available on January 8, 2021.

Episodes
The first six episodes in Season 1 were filmed in locations around the world including Israel, Qatar, New York, Silicon Valley, and Berlin.

References

External links 
 
 

2019 American television series debuts
American educational television series
American non-fiction television series
English-language television shows